City One is a station on the Tuen Ma line in Hong Kong. It serves City One Shatin (the station's namesake), Prima Villa, Sunshine Grove, Yu Chui Court and Yue Tin Court, and also serves five schools. Prince of Wales Hospital is also nearby. The print featured on the platform pillar and glass barrier is the annual dragon boat race held at Shing Mun River during the Dragon Boat Festival.

History 
On 21 December 2004, City One station opened to the public with the rest of KCR Ma On Shan Rail stations.

The Ma On Shan Line was renamed Tuen Ma Line Phase 1 at the time. City One station became an intermediate station on this temporary new line. 

Hence, City One was included in the project and is now an intermediate station on the Tuen Ma line, Hong Kong's longest railway line.

Station layout

Platforms 1 and 2 share the same island platform.

Exits

A: Yue Tin Court 
B: Prince of Wales Hospital 
C: City One Shatin 
D: Yu Chui Court

References

MTR stations in the New Territories
Ma On Shan line
Tuen Ma line
Sha Tin
Former Kowloon–Canton Railway stations
Yuen Chau Kok
Railway stations in Hong Kong opened in 2004